was a Japanese video game developer founded on May 7, 1993. It has developed games for Super NES, Dreamcast, GameCube, PlayStation 2, Game Boy Color, Nintendo DS, Nintendo 3DS, PlayStation Portable, PlayStation 3 and the Wii. The most notable games this company developed were part of the Lufia and Rune Factory series of video games. In November 2013, the company announced that it would cease operations and file for bankruptcy. The following year, many former members of the studio were hired by Marvelous, who had published many of their previous games.

Softography

Super NES
 Lufia & the Fortress of Doom
 Hat Trick Hero 2
 Lufia II: Rise of the Sinistrals
 Chaos Seed: Fūsui Kairoki (Japan)
 Energy Breaker (Japan)

Game Boy Color
Lufia: The Legend Returns

Saturn
Senkutsu Katsuryu Taisen: Chaos Seed

Dreamcast
Record of Lodoss War
Fushigi no Dungeon: Fuurai no Shiren Gaiden: Jokenji Asuka Kenzan!

Game Boy Advance
CIMA: The Enemy

GameCube
Disney's Party

PlayStation 2
Shining Force Neo
Shining Force EXA

PlayStation 3
Rune Factory: Tides of Destiny

PlayStation Portable
Rengoku: The Tower of Purgatory
Rengoku II: The Stairway to H.E.A.V.E.N

Wii
Rune Factory Frontier
Rune Factory: Tides of Destiny

Nintendo DS
Egg Monster Hero
Rune Factory: A Fantasy Harvest Moon
Rune Factory 2: A Fantasy Harvest Moon
Dramatic Dungeon Sakura Taisen
Rune Factory 3: A Fantasy Harvest Moon
Lufia: Curse of the Sinistrals

Nintendo 3DS

Rune Factory 4

References

External links
  (Archive)
Rap sheet at MobyGames

Video game companies established in 1993
Video game companies disestablished in 2013
Defunct video game companies of Japan
Japanese companies established in 1993
Japanese companies disestablished in 2013